Il cielo in una stanza is an album by Italian singer Mina, issued in 1960. It was published on CD in 1992 and re-issued in 2009 in a new vinyl version by label Carosello.

In 1965, the label Philips issued the same record, with Spanish versions of the songs, in Argentina.

Even if the actual authors of the song "Il cielo in una stanza" are Gino Paoli and Mogol, the credits of the album say the authors were Toang (Renato Angiolini) and Mogol. The song was covered by Mina herself in 1969 (for the album I discorsi) and in 1988 (for the album Oggi ti amo di più). The song is the opening song of Mike Patton on his Mondo Cane tribute album to Italian pop music.

Track listing

Side A

Side B

1960 albums
Mina (Italian singer) albums
Italian-language albums